Jim Murphy (5 December 1903 – 28 December 1987) was an Irish boxer. He competed in the men's light heavyweight event at the 1932 Summer Olympics. At the 1932 Summer Olympics, he defeated Johnny Miler, before losing to Gino Rossi and Peter Jorgensen, both by walkovers, thus conceding the bout for the bronze medal.

References

External links
 

1903 births
1987 deaths
Irish male boxers
Olympic boxers of Ireland
Boxers at the 1932 Summer Olympics
Place of birth missing